Foucault may refer to:

Foucault (surname)
Léon Foucault (1819–1868), French physicist. Three notable objects were named after him:
Foucault (crater), a small lunar impact crater
5668 Foucault, an asteroid
Foucault pendulum
Michel Foucault (1926–1984), French philosopher
Foucault (Deleuze book) (1986), a book about the French philosopher by Gilles Deleuze
Foucault (Merquior book) (1985), a book about the French philosopher by J. G. Merquior

See also
Foucault's Pendulum (1988), a novel by Umberto Eco
Charles de Foucauld, explorer of Morocco, Catholic religious and priest